Geoffrey Lane Paish MBE  (2 January 1922 – 3 February 2008) was a noted tennis player and administrator. Paish was born in Croydon, Surrey and educated at Mid-Whitgift School (now Trinity School) in Croydon.

Career
After World War II Paish worked at the Inland Revenue playing tennis only part-time. However he did manage to become a regular member of the GB Davis Cup team for which he played in 23 singles and 17 doubles matches.  Between 1951 and 1955 Paish won five consecutive singles titles at the South of England Championships tournament in Eastbourne. After Paish's playing days were over he rose to become one of the most influential administrators in post-World War II GB tennis.

References

External links
 Times obituary
 
 
 

1922 births
2008 deaths
English male tennis players
Members of the Order of the British Empire
People from Croydon
British male tennis players